is a professional Japanese baseball player. He is a pitcher for the Tohoku Rakuten Golden Eagles of Nippon Professional Baseball (NPB).

References 

1999 births
Living people
Nippon Professional Baseball pitchers
Baseball people from Hyōgo Prefecture
Tohoku Rakuten Golden Eagles players